Léia Henrique da Silva (born 1 March 1985) is a Brazilian volleyball player. She is a member of the Brazil women's national volleyball team and played for EC Pinheiros in 2014.

She was part of the Brazilian national team at the 2014 FIVB Volleyball Women's World Championship in Italy, and at the 2016 Olympic Games in Rio de Janeiro.

Clubs
  Apiv/Piracicaba (2006)
  Mackenzie/Cia. do Terno (2007–2008)
  Medley Banespa (2008–2009)
  Sollys/Osasco (2010–2012)
  EC Pinheiros (2012–2015)
  Minas Tênis Clube (2015–present)

Awards

Individuals
 2018 South American Club Championship – "Best Libero"
 2019 South American Club Championship – "Best Libero"
 2020 South American Club Championship – "Best Libero"

Clubs
 2010–11 Brazilian Superliga –  Runner-up, with Sollys Osasco
 2011–12 Brazilian Superliga –  Champion, with Sollys Osasco
 2018–19 Brazilian Superliga –  Champion, with Itambé Minas
2020–21 Brazilian Superliga –  Champion, with Itambé Minas
 2011 South American Club Championship –  Champion, with Sollys Osasco
 2018 South American Club Championship –  Champion, with Camponesa Minas
 2019 South American Club Championship –  Champion, with Itambé Minas
 2020 South American Club Championship –  Champion, with Itambé Minas
 2010 FIVB Club World Championship –  Runner-up, with Sollys Osasco
 2011 FIVB Club World Championship –  Bronze medal, with Sollys Osasco
 2018 FIVB Club World Championship –  Runner-up, with Itambé Minas

References

External links
scoresway.com
Players - Brazil - FIVB World Grand Prix 2016

1985 births
Living people
Brazilian women's volleyball players
Place of birth missing (living people)
Volleyball players at the 2016 Summer Olympics
Olympic volleyball players of Brazil
Liberos
People from Ibitinga